An overview of  South African intelligence service decorations and medals, which form part of the South African honours system.

National Intelligence Service

The National Intelligence Service was established in 1963 as Republican Intelligence, a branch of the South African Police.  It became a separate service, the Bureau for State Security, in 1968, and was renamed the Directorate of National Security in 1979 and the National Intelligence Service in 1980.

A series of decorations and medals was instituted for the NIS in 1981.  It was enlarged in 1987 and 1990.

 Decorations

 NIS Decoration for Distinguished Leadership (ED) (1981–94)
 NIS Cross for Valour (CV) (1981–94)
 NIS Decoration for Outstanding Leadership (OD) (1981–94)
 NIS Civil Decoration (1981–94)
 NIS Decoration (1981–94)
 NIS Medal for Distinguished Service (1981–94)
 NIS Civil Medal (1990–94)

 Long service medal

 NIS Medal for Faithful Service (1981–94)

The NIS was superseded in 1994 by the National Intelligence Agency and the South African Secret Service.

National Intelligence Agency and SA Secret Service

A new series of decorations and medals was instituted in 2005 for members of the National Intelligence Agency and the South African Secret Service (collectively referred to as the "Intelligence Services"):

 Decorations

  Intelligence Services Medal for Valour (South Africa) (MV) (2005- )
  Intelligence Services Outstanding Leadership Medal (South Africa) (OLM) (2005- )
  Intelligence Services Distinguished Service Medal (South Africa) (2005- )

 Long service medal

 Intelligence Services Loyal Service Medal (2005- )

See also

 British and Commonwealth orders and decorations
 South African civil honours
 South African military decorations
 South African orders and decorations
 South African police decorations
 South African prisons decorations

References

 Alexander, E. G. M., Barron G. K. B. and Bateman, A. J. (1986).  South African Orders, Decorations and Medals.  Human and Rousseau.
 Monick, S, (1990).   South African Civil Awards 1910-1990.  South African National Museum of Military History.

External links

 South African Medals Website

Orders, decorations, and medals of South Africa
South Africa and the Commonwealth of Nations
South African intelligence agencies
Intelligence and espionage-related awards and decorations